Brian Earl Bowles (born February 18, 1952) is a Canadian former professional ice hockey player who played in the World Hockey Association (WHA). Bowles played three games with the Cleveland Crusaders during the 1975–76 WHA season. He was drafted in the fourth round of the 1972 NHL Amateur Draft by the Toronto Maple Leafs. He played in the 1963 Quebec International Pee-Wee Hockey Tournament with his Drummondville minor ice hockey team.

Career statistics

References

External links

1952 births
Living people
Anglophone Quebec people
Canadian ice hockey defencemen
Cleveland Crusaders players
Cornwall Royals (QMJHL) players
Drummondville Rangers players
Ice hockey people from Quebec
Oklahoma City Blazers (1965–1977) players
Sportspeople from Drummondville
Rochester Americans players
Saginaw Gears players
Syracuse Blazers players
Toronto Maple Leafs draft picks
Tulsa Oilers (1964–1984) players
Verdun Maple Leafs (ice hockey) players
Canadian expatriate ice hockey players in the United States